Chinahat is a block in Lucknow City, Uttar Pradesh, India. According to 2011 Census of India the population of the village is 137,251 out of whom 71,211 are males and 66,040 are females. The village code is 0297. Lucknow serves as the block headquarters. The block is part of two tehsils, with some parts belonging to Lucknow tehsil and other parts belonging to Bakshi Ka Talab tehsil.

List of villages
Chinhat block contains the following 57 villages:

References

Cities and towns in Lucknow district